Xylocoris galactinus is a species of bugs in the family Lyctocoridae. It is found in Europe & Northern Asia (excluding China), North America, and Oceania.

References

Further reading

External links

 

Lyctocoridae
Articles created by Qbugbot
Insects described in 1837